Events from the year 1982 in the United States.

Incumbents

Federal government 
 President: Ronald Reagan (R-California)
 Vice President: George H. W. Bush (R-Texas)
 Chief Justice: Warren E. Burger (Minnesota)
 Speaker of the House of Representatives: Tip O'Neill (D-Massachusetts)
 Senate Majority Leader: Howard Baker (R-Tennessee)
 Congress: 97th

Events

January
 January 1 – Eddie Murphy makes his first appearance on "The Tonight Show Starring Johnny Carson".
 January 7 – The Commodore 64 8-bit home computer is launched by Commodore International in Las Vegas
 January 8 – AT&T agrees to divest itself into 22 subdivisions.
 January 11–17 – A brutal cold snap sends temperatures to all-time record lows in dozens of cities throughout the Midwestern United States.
 January 13 – Shortly after takeoff, Air Florida Flight 90 crashes into Washington, D.C.'s 14th Street Bridge and falls into the Potomac River, killing 78 (five survive). On the same day, a Washington Metro train derails to the north, killing three (the system's first fatal accident).
 January 17 – Cold Sunday sweeps over the northern United States.
 January 26 – President Reagan delivers his first State of the Union Address.
 January 28 – United States Army Brigadier General James L. Dozier is rescued by the Italian anti-terrorism Nucleo Operativo Centrale di Sicurezza (NOCS) force after being held captive for 42 days by the Red Brigades.

February
 February – Brake Masters, an automotive repair chain is founded in Tucson, Arizona.
 February 1 – Late Night with David Letterman makes its debut on NBC. The first guest is Bill Murray, who, 33 years later, will be the last guest David Letterman has on. 
 February 27 – Atlanta murders of 1979–81: Wayne Williams is convicted of the murdering two children and is sentenced to two consecutive life terms.
 February 28 – Adobe Systems is founded in the United States.

March
 March 10 – The United States places an embargo on Libyan oil imports, alleging Libyan support for terrorist groups.
 March 16 – In Newport, Rhode Island, Claus von Bülow is found guilty of the attempted murder of his wife.
 March 26 – A ground-breaking ceremony for the Vietnam Veterans Memorial is held in Washington, DC.
 March 29 – The 54th Academy Awards, hosted by Johnny Carson, are held at Dorothy Chandler Pavilion in Los Angeles. Hugh Hudson's Chariots of Fire wins Best Picture and three other Academy Awards. Warren Beatty wins Best Director for Reds out of 12 nominations, while Steven Spielberg's Raiders of the Lost Ark wins five awards.

April
 April 6 – A blizzard unprecedented in size for April dumps 1–2 feet of snow on the northeastern United States, closing schools and businesses, snarling traffic, and canceling several major league baseball games.
 April 21 – Queen Beatrix becomes the first Dutch monarch to address the United States Congress.
 April 23 – Dennis Wardlow, mayor of Key West, Florida, declares the independent "Conch Republic" for a day.

May
 May 1 – A crowd of over 100,000 attends the first day of the 1982 World's Fair in Knoxville, Tennessee. The fair is kicked off with an address by President Ronald Reagan. Over 11 million people attend the fair during its 6-month run.
 May 2 – The Weather Channel is begun in the U.S.
 May 5 – A Unabomber bomb explodes in the computer science department at Vanderbilt University; secretary Janet Smith is injured.
 May 12 – Braniff International Airways is declared bankrupt and ceases all flights.
 May 30 
 Indianapolis 500: In what Indianapolis Motor Speedway historian Donald Davidson and Speedway public address announcer Tom Carnegie later call the greatest moment in the track's history, 1973 winner Gordon Johncock wins his second race over 1979 winner Rick Mears by 0.16 seconds, the closest finish to that date, after Mears draws alongside Johncock with a lap remaining, after erasing a seemingly insurmountable advantage of more than 11 seconds in the final 10 laps.
 Cal Ripken Jr. plays the first of what eventually becomes his record-breaking streak of 2,632 consecutive Major League Baseball games in the United States.

June
 June 4 – Steven Spielberg and Tobe Hooper's horror film collaboration, Poltergeist, is released.
 June 8 – President Ronald Reagan becomes the first American chief executive to address a joint session of the British Parliament.
 June 12 – A rally against nuclear weapons draws 750,000 to New York City's Central Park. Jackson Browne, James Taylor, Bruce Springsteen and Linda Ronstadt attend. An international convocation at the Cathedral of St. John the Divine features prominent peace activists from around the world and afterward participants march on Fifth Avenue to Central Park for the rally.
 June 19 – Murder of Vincent Chin: Vincent Chin, a 27 year old Chinese American, is beaten unconscious by two white auto-workers in Highland Park, Michigan, who think he is Japanese and the cause of the declining prosperity of the American auto industry; he dies four days later.
 June 25 – The Institute for Puerto Rican Policy is founded in New York City to research and advocate for Puerto Rican and Latino community issues. In 2006, it changes its name to the National Institute for Latino Policy.
 June 30 – The Equal Rights Amendment to the Constitution of the United States falls short of the 38 states needed to pass.

July
 July 2 – Larry Walters, a.k.a. Lawnchair Larry, flies 16,000 feet above Long Beach, California, in a lawn chair with weather balloons attached.
 July 9 – Pan Am Flight 759 (Boeing 727) crashes in Kenner, Louisiana, killing all 146 on board and eight on the ground.
 July 12 – Checker Motors Corporation, an American taxicab manufacturer, ceases production.
 July 16 – In New York City, The Reverend Sun Myung Moon is sentenced to 18 months in prison and fined $25,000 for tax fraud and conspiracy to obstruct justice.

August
 August 20 
Lebanese Civil War: A multinational force lands in Beirut to oversee the PLO withdrawal from Lebanon. French troops arrive August 21, U.S. Marines August 25.
School teacher Carl Robert Brown murders eight people inside a welding shop in Miami, Florida, before being shot dead by a passing motorist.

September
 September 1 – The United States Air Force Space Command is founded.
 September 3 – Speaker O'Neill and President Reagan settle one of the most unforgettable deals in US history (Tax Equity and Fiscal Responsibility Act), which would cut the ratio of spending of three to one and add more taxes.
 September 5 – Iowa paperboy Johnny Gosch is kidnapped.
 September 15 – The first edition of USA Today is published.
 September 28 – 13 year old Lisa Ann Millican is murdered in Georgia after being abducted from a mall three days earlier by Alvin and Judith Neelley. She is tortured and raped, with Judith Neelley injecting her with Drano and Liquid Plumber in her neck and later shooting her to death.
 September 29–October 1 – The 1982 Chicago Tylenol murders occur when seven people in the Chicago area die after ingesting capsules laced with potassium cyanide.

October

 October 1 – In Orlando, Florida, Walt Disney World opens the second largest theme park, EPCOT Center, to the public for the first time.
 October 15 – The Garn–St. Germain Depository Institutions Act deregulates the U.S. savings and loan industry.
 October 19 – Car designer John DeLorean is arrested for selling cocaine to undercover FBI agents (he is later found not guilty on the grounds of entrapment).
 October 20 – World Series: The St. Louis Cardinals defeat the Milwaukee Brewers, 4 games to 3, to win their 9th World Series Title.
 October 30 – The DeLorean Motor Company ceases production.

November

 November – The severe early 1980s recession ends sometime this month.
 November – The unemployment rate peaks at 10.8%.
 November 2 – United States elections, 1982. The Republican Party loses 27 seats to the majority Democratic Party in the House.
 November 3 – The Dow Jones Industrial Average surges 43.41 points, or 4.25%, to close at 1,065.49, its first all-time high in more than 9 years. It last hit a record on January 11, 1973, when the average closed at 1,051.70. The points gain is the biggest ever up to this point.
 November 13 – The Vietnam Veterans Memorial is dedicated in Washington, D.C., after a march to its site by thousands of Vietnam War veterans.
 November 20 – University of California, Berkeley, executes "The Play" in a college football game against Stanford.  Completing a wacky 57-yard kickoff return that includes 5 laterals, Kevin Moen runs through Stanford band members who had prematurely come onto the field. His touchdown stands and California wins 25–20.
 November 25 – The Minneapolis Thanksgiving Day fire destroys an entire city block of downtown Minneapolis, including the headquarters of Northwestern National Bank.
 November 30 – Michael Jackson releases Thriller, the biggest-selling album of all time.

December
 December – John Warnock and Charles Geschke founds Adobe Systems Incorporated (now Adobe Inc.).
 December 2 – At the University of Utah, 61-year-old retired dentist Barney Clark becomes the first person to receive a permanent artificial heart (he lives for 112 days with the device).
 December 3 – A final soil sample is taken from the site of Times Beach, Missouri. It is found to contain 300 times the safe level of dioxin.
 December 7 – The first U.S. execution by lethal injection is carried out in Texas.
 December 23 – The United States Environmental Protection Agency recommends the evacuation of Times Beach, Missouri, due to dangerous levels of dioxin contamination.
 December 24 – The "Christmas Eve Blizzard of '82" hits Denver.
 December 29 – Paul "Bear" Bryant coaches his final college football game, leading Alabama to a 21–15 victory over Illinois in the Liberty Bowl at Memphis, Tennessee. Bryant dies of a massive heart attack four weeks later at age 69.

Undated
 A severe recession intensifies in the United States as part of the early 1980s recession.
 Seattle is officially dubbed the Emerald City after a contest is held to choose a new city slogan.
 Böttcher America, a printing industry manufacturer is founded.
 Gateway Packaging is founded in Illinois.

Ongoing
 Cold War (1947–1991)
 Early 1980s recession (1981–1982)

Births

January

 January 2 – Kevin Dudley, football player
 January 4 – Hollie Stevens, pornographic actress and model (d. 2012)
 January 5 – Jessica Chaffin, actress, comedian, and writer
 January 6 – Gilbert Arenas, basketball player
 January 7 – Lauren Cohan, actress
 January 8
 Wil Francis, rock musician, record producer, author, and artist
 Gaby Hoffmann, actress 
 January 10 
 Tavoris Cloud, boxer
 Josh Ryan Evans, actor (d. 2002)
 January 11
 Tony 'The Grindfather' Allen, basketball player
 Blake Heron, actor (d. 2017)
 January 12 – Dontrelle Willis, baseball player
 January 13
 Jason Ayers, wrestling referee
 Pawel Szajda, actor
 January 14
 Chad Aquino, boxer
 Vincent Bennett, singer and frontman for The Acacia Strain
 January 15
 Benjamin Agosto, skater
 Brett Lebda, hockey player
 January 17 
 David Blue, actor
 Dwyane Wade, basketball player
 January 18
 Quinn Allman, guitarist for The Used (2001–2015)
 Joanna Newsom, singer, harpist, pianist, and songwriter
 January 19 
 Pete Buttigieg, politician
 Jodie Sweetin, actress
 January 20 – Erin Wasson, model and actress
 January 22 – Jason Peters, football player
 January 23 – Patrick Levis, actor
 January 24 – Daveed Diggs, actor and rapper
 January 25 – Bella Blue, burlesque dancer
 January 26 – Reggie Hodges, football player
 January 28 – Erika M. Anderson, singer/songwriter
 January 29 
 Adam Lambert, singer/songwriter and actor
 Heidi Mueller, actress
 Riff Raff, rapper and television personality
 January 30 – DeStorm Power, internet personality

February

 February 2
 Katie Britt, attorney, businesswoman, and political candidate
 Kelly Mazzante, basketball player
 February 3
 Becky Bayless, wrestler
 Bridget Regan, actress
 February 4
 Nelson Akwari, soccer player
 Chris Sabin, wrestler
 Mandisa Stevenson, basketball player
 February 5
 China Mac, rapper
 Kevin Everett, football player
 February 6 – John Murante, politician
 February 8
 Eric Alexander, football player
 Danny Tamberelli, actor
 February 10 – Sean Anthony, DJ, music producer, rapper, songwriter, and screenwriter
 February 19 – Justin Gatlin, athlete
 February 13 – Lanisha Cole, model
 February 14 – Tati Westbrook, makeup artist
 February 16
 Lupe Fiasco, rapper
 Conway the Machine, rapper
 February 17 – Vanessa Atler, gymnast
 February 18 – Jessie Ward, actress
 February 22
 Cory Allen, author, podcast host, musician, composer, and mastering engineer
 Kim Allen, actress
 Kimball Allen, writer, journalist, playwright, and actor
 Anthony D'Esposito, politician
 Kelly Johnson, baseball player
 Hillary Scholten, politician
 February 23 – Adam Hann-Byrd, actor and screenwriter
 February 25
 Kimberly Caldwell, singer
 Maria Kanellis, wrestler and model
 Bert McCracken, singer and frontman for The Used
 February 26
 Mario Austin, basketball player
 DeRay Davis, actor and comedian
 February 28 – Randi Zuckerberg, businesswoman, author, and television creator

March

 March 1
 Eugene Amano, football player
 Dominic Rains, Iranian-born actor
 March 2 
 Mike Nugent, football player
 Ben Roethlisberger, football player
 March 3 – Jessica Biel, actress
 March 4 – Landon Donovan, soccer player
 March 8
 Daniel Keem, YouTuber
 Kat Von D, Mexican-born tattoo artist, reality television star, musician, and makeup artist
 March 10
 Kwame Brown, basketball player
 Dr DisRespect, streamer and internet personality
 March 11
 Brian Anderson, baseball player
 Thora Birch, actress and producer
 Lindsey McKeon, actress
 March 15 – Bobby Boswell, soccer player
 March 18 – Adam Pally, actor and comedian
 March 20 – Chris August, Christian singer/songwriter
 March 22 – Constance Wu, actress
 March 25
 Sean Faris, actor
 Danica Patrick, race car driver
 Jenny Slate, actress and comedian
 March 27 – Iman Crosson, actor
 March 28 – Pat Ryan, politician
 March 30 – Jason Dohring, actor
 March 31
 Calvin Armstrong, football player
 Ryland Blackinton, guitarist and vocalist for Cobra Starship
 Brian Tyree Henry, actor
 Chloé Zhao, Chinese-born film director

April

 April 1 – Taran Killam, actor, comedian, and writer
 April 3
 Trey Alexander, soccer player
 Jared Allen, football player
 April 4 – Justin Cook, voice actor
 April 5
 Wendy Allen, softball player
 Hayley Atwell, British-born actress
 Matt Pickens, soccer player
 April 6
 Aqua, record producer and composer
 Alana Austin, actress
 Bret Harrison, actor and singer
 April 7 – Sonjay Dutt, Indian-born wrestler
 April 10 – Chyler Leigh, actress
 April 14 – Neil Anderson, politician
 April 15
 Mike Anchondo, boxer
 Michael Aubrey, baseball player
 Tommy Vext, singer/songwriter and frontman for Bad Wolves (2017-2021), Divine Heresy (2006-2008), and Westfield Massacre
 April 16 – Gina Carano, actress, television personality, fitness model, and mixed martial artist
 April 17
 Aja Brown, politician
 Tyron Woodley, mixed martial artist
 April 19 – Shotti, record executive
 April 21
 Chagmion Antoine, broadcast journalist
 Claybourne Elder, actor, singer, and writer
 April 23 – Kyle Beckerman, soccer player
 April 24 – Kelly Clarkson, singer and American Idol winner
 April 26
 Benjamin Arthur, animator
 Brock Gillespie, basketball player
 Cooper Wallace, football player
 April 27 – Katrina Johnson, actress
 April 28
 Michael Carbonaro, television personality, actor, host, magician, and improv artist
 Donna Feldman, model and actress
 Nikko Smith, singer
 April 30
 Lloyd Banks, rapper
 Kirsten Dunst, actress, singer, and model

May

 May 2 – Mark Adamek, ice hockey player
 May 3 – Rebecca Hall, British-born actress
 May 6 – Jason Witten, football player
 May 7 – Matt Gaetz, politician
 May 8 – Jessica Aguilar, mixed martial artist
 May 9 – Rachel Boston, actress
 May 11
 Jonathan Jackson, actor, singer, and guitarist for Enation
 Andrew Walter, football player
 May 12 – Mobolaji Akiode, American-born Nigerian basketball player
 May 13 – Oguchi Onyewu, soccer player
 May 14 – Anjelah Johnson, actress
 May 15
 Alexandra Breckenridge, actress, voice actress, and photographer
 Jessica Sutta, dancer and singer, member of the Pussycat Dolls
 May 16 – Tiya Sircar, actress
 May 17
 Kaye Abad, actress
 Tony Parker, Belgian-born French-American basketball player
 May 18
 Andrea Armstrong, basketball player
 David Hallberg, ballet dancer
 May 20
 Jack Anthony, singer/songwriter, composer, and musician
 Candace Bailey, actress and television personality
 Sierra Boggess, theater actress
 May 21 –Tay Zonday, singer
 May 22
 Kyle Andrews, indie rock songwriter
 Apolo Ohno, Olympic short track speed skater and actor
 May 24 – Cody Hanson, drummer for Hinder
 May 26 – Joe Cunningham, politician
 May 28 – Alexa Davalos, actress
 May 31 – Casey James, 3rd place finalist on American Idol (season 9)

June

 June 2 – Whitney Able, actress and model
 June 4
 Sasha Allen, singer and actress
 MC Jin, rapper
 June 6 – Jaxson Ryker, wrestler
 June 7
 12th Planet, dubstep producer and DJ
 Virgil Vasquez, baseball player
 June 8 – Josh Pence, actor
 June 9 – Jacqueline Coleman, politician, 58th Lieutenant Governor of Kentucky
 June 10 – Tara Lipinski, figure skater
 June 11
 Marco Arment, businessman, co-creator of Tumblr 
 Johnny Candido, wrestler
 Diana Taurasi, basketball player
 June 12 
 Ben Blackwell, drummer 
 Artem Chigvintsev, Russian-American dancer 
 Jason David, football player
 June 13 – Nicole Galloway, politician
 June 14 – Freddie Gibbs, rapper
 June 15 – Haley Scarnato, singer
 June 16 – Chad Anderson, ice hockey player
 June 17 – Will Allen, football player
 June 19 
 David Pollack, football player
 Michael Yarmush, American-born Canadian actor and voice actor
 June 21  
Jussie Smollett, actor
 Benjamin Walker, actor
 June 22
 Johnny Bananas, television personality
 Ian Kinsler, baseball player
 June 23 – Beau Kittredge, ultimate AUDL player
 June 25
 La La Anthony, television personality, author, businesswoman, producer, and actress
 Ryan Block, technology entrepreneur
 June 28 – Jason Tam, actor and dancer
 June 29
 Matthew Mercer, voice actor, screenwriter, and director
 Lily Rabe, actress
 June 30 
 Lizzy Caplan, actress and model
 Mitch Maier, baseball player
 Delwyn Young, baseball player

July

 July 1
 Matthias Askew, football player
 Hilarie Burton, actress and producer
 Carmella DeCesare, model and wrestler
 July 2
 Ferras Alqaisi, singer/songwriter 
 Derek Yu, indie game designer, artist and blogger
 July 3 – Steph Jones, singer/songwriter
 July 4
 Hannah Harper, porn actress and director
 Mo McRae, actor, writer, and producer
 Mike 'The Situation' Sorrentino, model, actor, and author
 July 5
 Monica Day, model and journalist
 Dave Haywood, singer/songwriter and guitarist
 July 6 
 Brandon Jacobs, football player
 Misty Upham, actress (d. 2014)
 Tay Zonday, singer, musician, announcer, voice artist, actor, comedian and YouTube personality
 July 7
 C. J. Ah You, football player
 Nick Karner, actor and director
 July 8  
 Sophia Bush, actress
 Schuyler Fisk, actress and singer/songwriter
 Pendleton Ward, animator
 Hakim Warrick, basketball player
 July 10
 Alex Arrowsmith, rock/pop musician
 Andrew Greer, singer/songwriter
 July 11 – Lil Zane, rapper
 July 12
 Andy Kim, politician
 Jason Wright, football player, businessman, and executive
 July 14 – Ben Silbermann, entrepreneur and co-founder of Pinterest
 July 16 – Kellie Wells, Olympic hurdler
 July 17 – Amanda Warren, actress
 July 18 – Ryan Cabrera, Colombian-born pop rock musician
 July 19 – Jared Padalecki, actor
 July 20 – Percy Daggs III, actor 
 July 21
 Veronica Belmont, media personality
 Qasim Rashad, Pakistani-born author, human rights activist, politician, and attorney
 July 23 – Paul Wesley, actor
 July 24
 George Hu, American-born Taiwanese actor and singer
 Elisabeth Moss, actress
 July 25 
 Jared Golden, politician
 Oneohtrix Point Never, producer and composer
 Brad Renfro, actor (d. 2008)
 July 26 – Angel Acevedo, filmmaker
 July 27 – Wolé Parks, actor
 July 28
 Willie Amos, football player
 Tom Pelphrey, actor
 Cain Velasquez, wrestler and mixed martial artist
 July 29 – Allison Mack, German-born actress
 July 30
 Martin Starr, actor and comedian
 Yvonne Strahovski, actress
 July 31 – Jeff DaRosa, multi-instrumentalist for Dropkick Murphys

August

 August 5 – Lolo Jones, Olympic hurdler
 August 7
 Lauren Adams, actress and improviser
 Brit Marling, actress
 August 9
 Atia Abawi, German-born author and television journalist
 Tyson Gay, Olympic sprinter
 Jes Macallan, actress
 August 10
 Josh Anderson, baseball player
 Devon Aoki, supermodel and actress
 August 12 – Rob Sand, politician
 August 13
 Shani Davis, Olympic speed skater
 Sarah Huckabee Sanders, White House Press Secretary, and 47th Governor of Arkansas
 Sebastian Stan, Romanian-born actor
 August 16
 Nick Ayers, political strategist and consultant
 Todd Haberkorn, voice actor
 Matt Lauria, actor and musician
 August 17
 Ryan Driller, porn actor
 Mark Salling, actor (d. 2018)
 August 18 
 Cullen Finnerty, football player (d. 2013)
 August 19
 Erika Christensen, actress and singer
 Melissa Fumero, actress
 Stipe Miocic, mixed martial artist
 August 20 – Jamil Walker Smith, actor, director, producer, and writer
 August 21 – Daryl Austin, journalist
 August 23 – Natalie Coughlin, Olympic swimmer
 August 24 – Jennifer Widerstrom, personal trainer
 August 26
 Esteban Arias, soccer player
 John Mulaney, actor and comedian
 August 27 – Josh Duhon, actor 
 August 28
 LeAnn Rimes, country singer
 Kelly Thiebaud, actress  
 August 29
 Echo Kellum, actor and comedian 
 Leon Washington, football player
 August 30
 Juan Ciscomani, Mexican-born politician
 Andy Roddick, tennis player
 August 31 – Ian Crocker, Olympic swimmer

September

 September 1 – Matt Arroyo, mixed martial artist
 September 3 – Andrew McMahon, singer/songwriter, pianist, and frontman for Something Corporate and Jack's Mannequin
 September 5 – Urbano Antillón, boxer
 September 9 – Aftab Pureval, politician, mayor of Cincinnati, Ohio
 September 10
 Niklas Arrhenius, American-born Swedish Olympic shot putter and discus thrower
 Misty Copeland, ballerina
 Bret Iwan, voice actor
 September 12 – Jeff Jackson, politician
 September 15 – Jesse Andrews, novelist and screenwriter
 September 16 – Koby Altman, basketball coach and President of basketball operations of the Cleveland Cavaliers
 September 25
 Charlene Amoia, actress
 Garlin Gilchrist, politician, 64th Lieutenant Governor of Michigan
 September 26
 AR-Ab, rapper
 Damian Priest, wrestler
 September 27
 Anna Camp, actress
 Lil Wayne, rapper
 Darrent Williams, football player (d. 2007)
 September 28
 Emeka Okafor, basketball player
 Anderson Varejão, basketball player
 St. Vincent, singer/songwriter and multi-instrumentalist
 September 29 – Stephen "tWitch" Boss, dancer (d. 2022)
 September 30 
 Lacey Chabert, actress and singer
 Kieran Culkin, actor 
 Ryan Stout, actor

October

 October 2 – Tyson Chandler, basketball player
 October 3
 Applejaxx, Christian rapper
 Erik von Detten, actor and commodity broker
 October 4
 Ilhan Omar, Somali-born politician
 Jered Weaver, baseball player 
 October 6
 Bethany Allen, racing cyclist
 Michael Arden, actor, musician, and stage director
 Lucas Kunce, politician
 MC Lars, rapper
 Lil Wyte, rapper
 October 7
 Jessica Allister, softball player and coach
 Robby Ginepri, tennis player
 October 9
 Colin Donnell, actor
 Travis Rice, snowboarder
 October 11 – Salim Stoudamire, basketball player
 October 12
 Bashir Ahmad, Pakistani-born mixed martial artist
 Julie Kagawa, author
 October 15 – Brandon Jay McLaren, Canadian-born actor
 October 16 – Alan Anderson, basketball player
 October 17 – Abe Alvarez, baseball player and coach
 October 18 
 Shauntay Henderson, criminal and convicted killer
 Ne-Yo, singer/songwriter
 October 20 – Katie Featherston, actress
 October 21 – Matt Dallas, actor
 October 22
 Heath Miller, football player
 Caleb Rowden, politician
 October 24 – Guillermo Alvarez, gymnast
 October 27 – Dennis Moran, criminal and computer hacker (d. 2013)
 October 28
 Michael Stahl-David, actor
 Anthony Lerew, baseball player
 October 30 – Craig Albernaz, baseball coach
 October 31 – Matt Anderson, ice hockey player

November

 November 1 – John Allen, basketball player
 November 2 – Adam Springfield, actor
 November 3 – M. K. Asante, author, filmmaker, recording artist, and professor
 November 4 – Travis Van Winkle, actor
 November 5
 Alaché, Nigerian-born Christian R&B singer/songwriter
 Tui Alailefaleula, football player
 David Archer, football player and coach
 November 7 – Marc Orrell, guitarist
 November 8
 Ted DiBiase, wrestler and actor
 Devin Hester, football player
 November 10 – Heather Matarazzo, actress 
 November 11 – Brittny Gastineau, model and socialite 
 November 12 – Anne Hathaway, actress
 November 14
 Boosie Badazz, rapper 
 Laura Ramsey, actress
 November 15
 Elliot Anderson, politician
 Yaya DaCosta, actress
 D. J. Fitzpatrick, football player
 Joe Kowalewski, football player
 Lofa Tatupu, football player
 November 16 – Amar'e Stoudemire, basketball player
 November 17 – Becky Albertalli, author
 November 18 – Damon Wayans Jr., actor and comedian
 November 19 – Shin Dong-hyuk, North Korean-born defector and human rights activist
 November 20
 Bobby Creekwater, rapper
 Margo Stilley, actress and writer
 November 21 – Ryan Starr, singer
 November 23 – Tom Denney, guitarist for A Day to Remember (2003-2009)
 November 24 – Ryan Fitzpatrick, football player  
 November 28
 Adam McArthur, actor and martial artist
 Malcolm Goodwin, actor
 November 29 
 Lucas Black, actor
 Ashley Force Hood, race car driver
 Eddie Spears, actor
 November 30
 Nick Hipa, guitarist for As I Lay Dying (2003-2020) and Wovenwar
 Jason Pominville, hockey player

December

 December 1 – Lance Gooden, politician
 December 3 – Dascha Polanco, Dominican-born actress
 December 5
 Eddy Curry, basketball player
 Trai Essex, American football player
 Keri Hilson, R&B recording artist, songwriter, and actress
 Gabriel Luna, actor
 December 7 – Lou Amundson, basketball player
 December 8
 Raquel Atawo, tennis player
 Nicki Minaj, American rapper
 December 14 – Jesse Garcia, actor
 December 16 – Amanda Stuck, politician
 December 20 
 David Cook, singer/songwriter and guitarist 
 David Wright, baseball player
 December 21
 Rob Abiamiri, football player
 Mike Gansey, basketball player
 December 22 – Rodney Martin, sprinter
 December 25
 Shawn Andrews, football player
 James Apollo, singer, bandleader, and producer
 December 28
 Cedric Benson, football player (d. 2019)
 Beau Garrett, actress and model
 December 29 – Alison Brie, actress

Full Date Unknown

 Zarouhie Abdalian, artist
 Nina Chanel Abney, artist
 Curtis Adams, magician
 Daniel Alaei, poker player
 Maytha Alhassen, journalist
 Colin C. Allrich, musician, remixer, audio engineer, and record producer
 Alsarah, Sudanese-born singer/songwriter and ethnomusicologist
 Roy Altman, judge
 Lisa Alvarado, visual artist and harmonium player
 Sana Amanat, American-born Pakistani comic book editor
 Ruby Onyinyechi Amanze, Nigeria-born British-American artist
 Triston Jay Amero, terrorist (d. 2008)
 Polina Anikeeva, Russian-born materials scientist
 Daniel Arango, Colombian-born artist
 Maria Aspan, journalist
 Roy Assaf, Israeli-born jazz pianist and composer
 Evan Sharp. entrepreneur and co-founder of Pinterest

Deaths

 February 11 – Eleanor Powell, actress and dancer (b. 1912)
 February 17 – Thelonious Monk, pianist and composer (b. 1917)
 March 5 – John Belushi, comedian and actor (b. 1949)
 May 1 – William Primrose, Scottish-born violist in Provo, Utah (b. 1904)
 June 12 – Al Rinker, singer-songwriter (b. 1907)
 June 8 – Satchel Paige, baseball player (b. 1906)
 July 2 – DeFord Bailey, country musician (b. 1899)
 July 6 – Bob Johnson, baseball outfielder and manager (b. 1905)
 July 18 – John Maxwell, actor (b. 1918)
 July 19 – Hugh Everett III, American physicist (b. 1930)
 July 21 – Dave Garroway, television host (b. 1913)
 July 22 – Lloyd Waner, baseball player (Pittsburgh Pirates) and a member of the MLB Hall of Fame (b. 1906)
 August 12 – Henry Fonda, actor (b. 1905)
 September 30 – Bill George, American football player (Chicago Bears); member of the Pro Football Hall of Fame (b. 1929)
 October 18 – Bess Truman, First Lady of the United States, Second Lady of the United States (b. 1885)
 October 29 – Joyce Hall, founder of Hallmark Cards (b. 1891) 
 November 1 
 James Broderick, actor (b. 1927)
 King Vidor, film director, producer and screenwriter (b. 1894)
 November 16 – Al Haig, pianist (b. 1924)
 December 21 – Ants Oras, Estonian-American author and academic (b. 1900)
 December 27 – Jack Swigert, NASA astronaut (b. 1931)

See also
 1982 in American television
 List of American films of 1982
 Timeline of United States history (1970–1989)

References

External links
 

 
1980s in the United States
United States
United States
Years of the 20th century in the United States